The JamaicaVM is a virtual machine and build environment for developing and running realtime Java programs.  It includes a deterministic garbage collector and implements the RTSJ.  It is designed for use in both realtime and embedded systems.  It provides the base runtime environment for JamaicaCAR.

See also 
Aicas
Garbage collection (computer science)
Real time Java
Embedded Java

References

External links 
aicas
JamaicaVM

Java virtual machine